For exergonic and endergonic reactions, see the separate articles:
Endergonic reaction
Exergonic reaction

See also
Exergonic process
Endergonic
Exothermic process
Endothermic process